German submarine U-231 was a Type VIIC U-boat of Nazi Germany's Kriegsmarine during World War II.

The submarine was laid down on 30 January 1942 at the Friedrich Krupp Germaniawerft yard at Kiel as yard number 661, launched on 1 October, and commissioned on 14 November under the command of Kapitänleutnant Wolfgang Wenzel.

After training with the 5th U-boat Flotilla at Kiel, U-231 was transferred to the 3rd U-boat Flotilla on 1 May 1943 which was based at La Pallice in France, for front-line service. In three war patrols, the U-boat sank or damaged no merchant ships. She was a member of eleven wolfpacks.

U-231 was sunk on 13 January 1944 in the North Atlantic northeast of the Azores by a British aircraft.

Design
German Type VIIC submarines were preceded by the shorter Type VIIB submarines. U-231 had a displacement of  when at the surface and  while submerged. She had two shafts and two  propellers.

U-231 was fitted with five  torpedo tubes (four fitted at the bow and one at the stern), fourteen torpedoes, one  SK C/35 naval gun, 220 rounds, and an anti-aircraft gun. The boat had a complement of between forty-four and sixty.

Service history

First patrol
U-231 departed Kiel on 13 April 1943. On the 22nd, she was attacked on two occasions by Catalina aircraft of No. 190 Squadron RAF. Both attacks caused no damage, although a man was lost overboard during the first. She was then attacked on the 23rd (twice), the first of which resulted in a flooded conning tower. She was also attacked on 21 May by American Avenger aircraft from the carrier . The result was a chlorine gas leak and both radio transmitters being knocked out and the boat returned La Pallice in occupied France on 31 May.

Second patrol
This foray commenced from Bordeaux, took her to the middle of the Atlantic Ocean and terminated in La Pallice.

Third patrol and loss
U-231 was sunk northeast of the Azores by depth charges from a RAF Vickers Wellington of 172 Squadron on 13 January 1944. Seven men died, there were 47 survivors.

Wolfpacks
U-231 took part in eleven wolfpacks, namely:
 Star (27 April - 4 May 1943) 
 Fink (4 – 6 May 1943) 
 Elbe (7 – 10 May 1943) 
 Elbe 1 (10 – 14 May 1943) 
 Mosel (19 – 22 May 1943) 
 Schlieffen (14 – 22 October 1943) 
 Siegfried (22 – 27 October 1943) 
 Siegfried 1 (27 – 30 October 1943) 
 Körner (30 October - 2 November 1943) 
 Borkum (1 – 3 January 1944) 
 Borkum 3 (3 – 13 January 1944)

References

Bibliography

External links

German Type VIIC submarines
World War II submarines of Germany
World War II shipwrecks in the Atlantic Ocean
U-boats commissioned in 1942
U-boats sunk in 1943
U-boats sunk by depth charges
U-boats sunk by British aircraft
1942 ships
Ships built in Kiel
Maritime incidents in January 1944